The 2020 Giro d'Italia was the 103rd edition of the Giro d'Italia, one of cycling's Grand Tours. The Giro began in Monreale with an individual time trial on 3 October, and Stage 11 occurred on 14 October with a stage to Rimini. The race finished in Milano on 25 October.

Classification standings

Stage 1
3 October 2020 - Monreale to Palermo,  (ITT)

Stage 2
4 October 2020 - Alcamo to Agrigento,

Stage 3
5 October 2020 - Enna to Etna,

Stage 4
6 October 2020 - Catania to Villafranca Tirrena,

Stage 5
7 October 2020 - Mileto to Camigliatello Silano,

Stage 6
8 October 2020 - Castrovillari to Matera,

Stage 7
9 October 2020 - Matera to Brindisi,

Stage 8
10 October 2020 - Giovinazzo to Vieste,

Stage 9
11 October 2020 - San Salvo to Roccaraso (Aremogna),

Rest day 1
12 October 2020

Stage 10
13 October 2020 - Lanciano to Tortoreto,

Stage 11
14 October 2020 - Porto Sant'Elpidio to Rimini,

References

2020 Giro d'Italia
Giro d'Italia stages